Mechanics Arts High School or Mechanic Arts High School may refer to:

John D. O'Bryant School of Mathematics & Science in Boston, Massachusetts, originally named "Mechanic Arts High School"
Hutchinson Central Technical High School in Buffalo, New York, originally named "Mechanic Arts High School"
Mechanic Arts High School (Saint Paul, Minnesota), a former school in Saint Paul, Minnesota